Line Røddik Hansen (born 31 January 1988) is a Danish former footballer who played as a defender for Danish club FC Nordsjælland and the Denmark women's national team. She previously played for French club Olympique Lyon and Spanish club FC Barcelona, as well as Tyresö FF and FC Rosengård of the Swedish Damallsvenskan. She accrued 132 caps for the Denmark women's national football team between her debut in February 2006 and her retirement in December 2020.

Club career
After joining Brøndby IF in 2007 Røddik Hansen won the Danish championship in her first season with the club. She was named club Player of the Year in 2008. She scored seven goals for Brøndby in a total of 78 appearances across all competitions.

Copenhagen-born Røddik Hansen left Brøndby IF for newly promoted Damallsvenskan club Tyresö FF ahead of the 2010 season, rejecting a competing offer from the American Women's Professional Soccer (WPS). She spent three seasons playing at left-back, before moving inside to centre back when the Swedish club signed Sara Thunebro in 2013.

Tyresö dramatically won the Damallsvenskan title for the first time in the 2012 season and Røddik Hansen collected her first league winner's medal. She played in Tyresö's 4–3 defeat by Wolfsburg in the 2014 UEFA Women's Champions League Final.

Tyresö suffered a financial implosion in 2014 and withdrew from the 2014 Damallsvenskan season, expunging all their results and making all their players free agents. The Stockholm County Administrative Board published the players' salaries, showing Røddik Hansen was one of the lower paid players, at SEK 25 000 per month.

In July 2014, Røddik Hansen signed a two-and-a-half-year contract with reigning Damallsvenskan champions, FC Rosengård, of Malmö. She transferred to French champions Olympique Lyon in January 2016. She was cup-tied for Lyon's win in the 2016 UEFA Women's Champions League Final. In July 2016 Røddik Hansen signed for FC Barcelona.

Røddik Hansen spent the final year of her career playing for Danish club FC Nordsjælland. She announced her retirement from football in an Instagram post in December 2020.

International career

On 25 February 2006 Røddik Hansen made her senior Denmark debut, playing the second half of a 3–2 friendly win in Switzerland.

She was the youngest member of the Danish squad at the 2007 FIFA Women's World Cup in China at the age of 19 but did not appear in any matches. At UEFA Women's Euro 2009 in Finland Røddik Hansen played in all three group games as Denmark made a first round exit.

In 2010, she was named Danish Football Player of the Year.

The 2013 Algarve Cup match against Germany marked Røddik Hansen's 75th international cap. She was named in national coach Kenneth Heiner-Møller's squad for UEFA Women's Euro 2013. She was also named in national coach Nils Nielsen's squad for UEFA Women's Euro 2017 where she was an integral part of Denmark achieving second place.

Honours
Brøndby IF
 Elitedivisionen: Winner 2007, 2008
 Danish Women's Cup: Winner 2007

Tyresö FF 
 Damallsvenskan: Winner 2012

FC Rosengård
 Damallsvenskan: Winner 2014, 2015

 FC Barcelona
 Copa de la Reina de Fútbol: Winner 2017, 2018
 Copa Catalunya: Winner 2016, 2017

Style of play
Upon joining Barcelona, Røddik Hansen said that she liked the team's possession-based tactics: "I play both at centre back and left back, and I think I’m good at playing the ball out of defence."

Personal life
Røddik Hansen graduated from the Swedish School of Sport and Health Sciences in June 2013, with a qualification in sports coaching.

References

External links

 
 
 Danish Football Union (DBU) statistics 
 
 

1988 births
Living people
Danish women's footballers
Denmark women's international footballers
Tyresö FF players
Damallsvenskan players
Brøndby IF (women) players
FC Rosengård players
Expatriate women's footballers in Sweden
Danish expatriate sportspeople in Sweden
Danish expatriate sportspeople in France
Danish expatriate sportspeople in Spain
Olympique Lyonnais Féminin players
Expatriate women's footballers in France
Expatriate women's footballers in Spain
FIFA Century Club
Primera División (women) players
FC Barcelona Femení players
Division 1 Féminine players
Women's association football defenders
Danish expatriate sportspeople in the Netherlands
2007 FIFA Women's World Cup players
FC Nordsjælland (women) players
Ballerup-Skovlunde Fodbold (women) players
Footballers from Copenhagen
UEFA Women's Euro 2017 players